Pigafetta's Dictionary is the first Italian–Malay vocabulary written by the chronicler Antonio Pigafetta. These are the list words of the languages of various natives he met during his journey with Ferdinand Magellan.

Background
The Portuguese explorer Ferdinand Magellan (4 February 1480 – 27 April 1521) led about 270 men on five ships from the port of Sanlúcar de Barrameda in Spain to look for the Spice Islands of Maluku. The Venetian chronicler Antonio Pigafetta (c. 1491 – c. 1531) was with the expedition from which he served as assistant to Magellan and to keep records and the voyage's journal,  and was fortunate to be one of the 18 men who have returned to Spain in 1522.
 
One of his notable works in the voyage was his narrative and the list of words of various languages of natives during the long journey which includes:
Brazilian native language – 8 words, Patagonian language – 90 words, Philippine language – 160 words, Malay – more than 400 words, which Pigafetta calls as Moorish (Muslim people of Moluccas)

In Pigafetta's book, Primo viaggio intorno al mondo, he takes care to record as many words as he can.The chronicle of Pigafetta was one of the most cited documents by historians who wished to study the precolonial Philippines. As one of the earliest written accounts, Pigafetta was seen as a credible source for a period, which was prior unchronicled and undocumented.

Some list of words

Below are some list of words as translated by Pigafetta on the third column, fourth column is the equivalent Philippine language that can be found from Diccionario bisaya-español y español-bisaya (Manila, 1885) by Juan Félix de la Encarnación and from Diccionario Hispano-bisaya y bisaya-español (Manila, 1895) by Antonio Sanchez de la Rosa and/or the equivalent Visayan word. It is regarded as the first European record of the Cebuano language and the oldest dictionary in the Philippines. Some words can be distinguished as Malay.

Notes

References

Further reading

 

Vocabulary
Dictionaries
Primary sources for early Philippine history
Primary sources on Philippine history in the 16th century